Ondulopsis is a genus of  very small sea snails, marine gastropod molluscs in the family Cerithiopsidae.

Species
 Ondulopsis annae Cecalupo & Perugia, 2012
 Ondulopsis conica Cecalupo & Perugia, 2012
 Ondulopsis fusca Cecalupo & Perugia, 2012
 Ondulopsis intricata Cecalupo & Perugia, 2012
 Ondulopsis tricolor Cecalupo & Perugia, 2012
 Ondulopsis turrita Cecalupo & Perugia, 2012
 Ondulopsis violacea Cecalupo & Perugia, 2012

References

 Cecalupo A. & Perugia I. (2012) Family Cerithiopsidae H. Adams & A. Adams, 1853 in the central Philippines (Caenogastropoda: Triphoroidea). Quaderni della Civica Stazione Idrobiologica di Milano 30: 1-262.

External links
 

Cerithiopsidae
Gastropod genera